Tây Vu Vương, or the "King of Tây Vu" (fl. 111 BC), is the title attributed by some Vietnamese historians to the leader of a popular revolt in the Jiaozhi and Jiuzhen commanderies against the rule of the Chinese Western Han dynasty.

Tây Vu Vương was the leader of the Tây Vu autonomous area of which the centre was Cổ Loa. Some historians consider that he was probably a descendant of An Dương Vương. Historian Trần Quốc Vượng saw the king as having established a fief or government at Cổ Loa. At the end of Han conquest of Nanyue, he was killed by his assistant Huang Tong (黄同; Hoàng Đồng).

See also
 Nanyue
 Triệu dynasty
 Han conquest of Nanyue
 Baiyue

References

Vietnamese kings
Nanyue